Ponguleti Sudhakar Reddy is an Indian politician belonging to Bharatiya Janata Party. He is a Member of Legislative Council in Andhra Pradesh and previously was Secretary, All India Congress Committee.

Early life
Sudhakar Reddy was born in Narayanpuram, Kallur mandal, Khammam in Telangana.
He is the second son of Laxmareddy and Nagamma Garu.

Career
Ponguleti Sudhakar Reddy was Youth Congress President. Ponguleti Sudhakar Reddy served as the Chairman of A.P. Tourism Development Corporation. Mr. Reddy was a Part-time Non-official Director of Indian Bank. He has been designated as an "Ambassador for world peace" by the Interreligious and International Federation for World Peace. He is an Agriculturist and a Social Worker. Mr. Reddy has a bachelor's degree in commerce and a master's degree in linguistics from Osmania University. Ponguleti Sudhakar Reddy resigned from Congress party and decided to join the Bharatiya Janata Party in 2019.

References

People from Khammam district
Indian National Congress politicians from Telangana
Living people
Year of birth missing (living people)
Bharatiya Janata Party politicians from Telangana
Members of the Telangana Legislative Council